The 2004–05 season was the 104th season in Athletic Bilbao's history and their 74th consecutive season in La Liga, the top division of Spanish football.

Season summary

In the previous season, new manager Ernesto Valverde guided Athletic Bilbao to 5th place in La Liga, their highest placing in six seasons. This also allowed them their first European participation since 1998, qualifying for the 2004–05 UEFA Cup.

Valverde's second season in charge was less successful in the league, as Athletic suffered three more losses than the year before and slipped to 9th. They enjoyed more success in the Copa del Rey, reaching the semifinals before being knocked out on penalties by eventual champions Real Betis.

Their European adventure began in the UEFA Cup first round, where they were drawn against Trabzonspor of Turkey. Despite losing the away first leg 3–2, they qualified for the group stage by winning 2–0 at home. They were drawn in Group B, and suffered another defeat in Turkey, this time against Beşiktaş. However, they won their other three games - against Parma of Italy, Steaua București of Romania, and a crushing 7–1 victory over Standard Liège of Belgium - to progress as group winners. Their opponents in the next round were Austria Wien, and despite a creditable 0–0 draw in the away leg, Bilbao were eliminated after a 2–1 defeat at home.

Valverde left his post at the end of the season, and was replaced by José Luis Mendilibar. Mendilibar lasted only until the following October, while Valverde would return to the club for a second spell as head coach in 2013.

Squad statistics

Appearances and goals

|}

Results

La Liga

League table

UEFA Cup

First round

Athletic Bilbao won 4–3 on aggregate

Group B

Round of 32

Austria Wien won 2–1 on aggregate

See also
2004–05 La Liga
2004–05 Copa del Rey
2004–05 UEFA Cup

External links

References

Athletic Bilbao
Athletic Bilbao seasons